Vanderbank is a surname. Notable people with the surname include:

John Vanderbank (1694–1739), English painter
Peter Vanderbank, French-English engraver